In enzymology, a glycerol-3-phosphate oxidase is an enzyme that catalyzes the chemical reaction

sn-glycerol 3-phosphate + O2  glycerone phosphate + H2O2

Thus, the two substrates of this enzyme are sn-glycerol 3-phosphate and O2, whereas its two products are dihydroxyacetone phosphate (DHAP) and H2O2.

This enzyme belongs to the family of oxidoreductases, specifically those acting on the CH-OH group of donor with oxygen as acceptor.  The systematic name of this enzyme class is sn-glycerol-3-phosphate:oxygen 2-oxidoreductase. Other names in common use include glycerol phosphate oxidase, glycerol-1-phosphate oxidase, glycerol phosphate oxidase, L-alpha-glycerophosphate oxidase, alpha-glycerophosphate oxidase, and L-alpha-glycerol-3-phosphate oxidase.  This enzyme participates in glycerophospholipid metabolism.  It employs one cofactor, FAD.

References

 
 

EC 1.1.3
Flavoproteins
Enzymes of unknown structure